Persatuan Sepakbola Luwu Timur (simply known as Perslutim) is an Indonesian football club based in East Luwu Regency, South Sulawesi. They currently compete in the Liga 3.

Honours
 Liga Indonesia Third Division South Sulawesi
 Third-place: 2013

References

Sport in South Sulawesi
Football clubs in Indonesia
Football clubs in South Sulawesi
Association football clubs established in 2003
2003 establishments in Indonesia